Robert Pollard Is Off to Business is 10th studio album released by singer-songwriter Robert Pollard on June 2, 2008. This is the first LP release from Robert Pollard's new record label Guided by Voices Inc.  All instrumentation on the album was performed by producer Todd Tobias.  Many of the songs on the album were over three minutes in length, which is unusual for a Pollard release.

Track listing
 "The Original Heart"
 "The Blondes"
 "1 Years Old"
 "Gratification to Concrete"
 "No One but I"
 "Weatherman and Skin Goddess"
 "Confessions of a Teenage Jerk-Off"
 "To the Path!"
 "Western Centipede"
 "Wealth and Hell-Being"

References
 Pollard Leaves Merge, Starts Label for New Album  (Pitchfork 2-18-2008
 robertpollard.net press release on new album

2008 albums
Robert Pollard albums